The ALCO RS-2 is a  B-B diesel-electric locomotive built by the American Locomotive Company (ALCO) from 1946 to 1950. ALCO introduced the model after World War II as an improvement on the ALCO RS-1. Between 1946 and 1950, 377 examples of the RS-2 were built, primarily for American and Canadian customers.

ALCO discontinued the RS-2 in 1950 in favor of the very similar RS-3, which was significantly more popular. Several examples have been preserved.

Design and development
The RS-2 was a further development of the road switcher concept. It had more horsepower than the RS-1, to better meet the needs of heavy road service. Externally, the RS-2 bodywork was more rounded, while mechanically the new 244 engine was introduced. A turbocharged four stroke V12 with a  bore and stroke developing 1,500 (later 1,600) hp at 1,000 rpm, it had a smaller cylinder, higher cylinder speed design than the 539 used in the RS-1. Production of the RS-2 was delayed several months while Alco worked out the new four pipe divided low rise manifold for the GE constant pressure RD-1 turbocharger. The 244 engine was not a reliable design, however, and was replaced in less than ten years by the Alco 251 engine.

History
377 locomotives were produced — 368 by the American Locomotive Company, and 9 by ALCO subsidiary Montreal Locomotive Works in Canada. Eight of the ALCO RS-2s were exported to Canada. The RS-2 has a single, 12 cylinder, model 244B engine, developing . Thirty-one locomotives built by Alco between February and May 1950 were instead powered by a 12 cylinder 244C  engine.

ALCO built the RS-2 to compete with EMD, Fairbanks-Morse, and Baldwin Locomotive Works. In 1947, Fairbanks-Morse introduced the  H-15-44. Also in that year, Baldwin introduced the  DRS-4-4-1500.

In 1954, EMD introduced the GP9.

EMD produced 2,734 GP-7s. ALCO/MLW produced 377 RS-2s, and 1,418 RS-3s. Fairbanks-Morse produced 30 H-15-44s, and 296 H-16-44s. Baldwin produced 32 DRS-4-4-1500s, and 127 AS-16s.

The Delaware and Hudson Railway rebuilt 13 of its RS-2s for passenger service, including on the Laurentian. The D&H added a steam generator and  water tank.

Original owners
ALCO and Montreal Locomotive Works in Canada built 377 locomotives. Cited and mirrored roster

Survivors

Very few RS-2s survive today. Three former Kennecott Copper locomotives are preserved, including Kennecott Copper 908 (former number 104) at the Western Pacific Railroad Museum at Portola, California. KCC 908 once served the mines out of Ely, Nevada along the Nevada Northern Railway. Nevada Northern 105 is at Ely, Nevada, it was formerly the Kennecott Copper 105. Kennecott Copper 103 is at the San Diego Railroad Museum in Campo, California. It is painted as Santa Fe 2098. Another RS-2 is in active service on the Texas State Railroad (rebuilt as an RS-2-CAT). It is the former Union Railroad 608. The first production RS-2, originally sold to the Detroit & Mackinac RR as their number 466, was fully operable in freight service on the Michigan Southern Railroad (1989) until a few years ago. As of September 2005, the 466 was stored out of service near the Michigan Southern's office in White Pigeon, Michigan, it was finally scrapped in December 2011. The former Detroit & Mackinac 469 was sold to Waymore Power and may be restored. The former Elgin Joliet and Eastern 801 is preserved in Jala, Mexico as a Las Encinas SA de CV 801. And MLW built Roberval and Saguenay 20 is at the Canadian Railway Museum.

See also 
 List of ALCO diesel locomotives
 List of MLW diesel locomotives
Baldwin DRS-4-4-1500 - contemporary design by Baldwin
EMD GP7 - contemporary design by EMD
FM H-15-44 - contemporary design by Fairbanks-Morse

Notes

Footnotes

References 
 
 
 
 
 
 Steinbrenner, Richard T. (2003). The American Locomotive Company: A Centennial Remembrance. On Track Publishers LLC, New Brunswick, NJ. . Chapters IX, X, and XI.

B-B locomotives
RS-2
RS-2
Diesel-electric locomotives of the United States
Railway locomotives introduced in 1946
Standard gauge locomotives of Canada
Standard gauge locomotives of the United States
Diesel-electric locomotives of Canada